Doina Gherman (born 29 November 1982) is a Moldovan member of Parliament. She is also a women’s rights activist working to protect victims of domestic and gender-based violence. She was awarded the International Women of Courage Award in 2022.

References

Recipients of the International Women of Courage Award
Living people
Year of birth missing (living people)
Moldovan female MPs
Women's rights activists
Moldovan activists